Eloy Enrique Vidal Coloma (26 September 1951 – 6 April 2004), known as Paco Vidal in Belgium, was a Chilean professional footballer. He played as a  defensive midfielder for clubs in Chile, Belgium and France.

Career
A defensive midfielder, as a youth player, Vidal was with club Carlos Vial of the Asociación Osmán Pérez Freire from his city of birth, Valparaíso, moving after to Rangers de Talca.

In his homeland, he also played for Aviación (1974–75), and Naval (1976) in the top division. 

With Rangers in the second division, they got promotion to the 1978 Primera División de Chile, after being the runner-up in the 1977 Segunda División de Chile.

In 1978 he emigrated to Europe and joined Royale Union in the Belgian second level for fourteen thousand dollars. In that club, he stood out playing alongside the Luxembourgian Paul Philipp.

His last clubs were Orange FC in France and both RRC Etterbeck and VEM Tombeek in Belgium.

Post-retirement
He graduated as a football manager in Belgium, returned to Chile at the end of the 1990s and had a stint as coach of Quintero Unido in the Chilean fourth level in the 2000 season.  

In his last years, he coached amateur teams in Arica such as Esmeralda, Emelnor and the team of former footballers of Santiago Wanderers who lived in that city. At the same time, he performed as player for clubs such as Adsubliata and Asoagro.

Personal life
In Belgium, he was known as Paco Vidal.

In Valparaíso, before emigrating to Belgium, he was in a love relationship with Patricia Lazo Pinochet, with whom he had two children, Carolina and Christopher. 

In Belgium, he married a Belgian citizen. After separating from her, he fell into a depression and alcoholism, became a homeless person in Arica, having previously lived along with his aunt Egea Vidal, and suffered cirrhosis. 

He died in Arica due to a bronchopneumonia. His body was found inside a car where he used to stay overnight and preserved photos of his Belgian wife and letters for her.

References

1952 births
2004 deaths
Sportspeople from Valparaíso
Chilean footballers
Chilean expatriate footballers
Rangers de Talca footballers
C.D. Aviación footballers
Naval de Talcahuano footballers
Royale Union Saint-Gilloise players
Chilean Primera División players
Primera B de Chile players
Chilean expatriate sportspeople in Belgium
Chilean expatriate sportspeople in France
Expatriate footballers in Belgium
Expatriate footballers in France
Association football midfielders
Chilean football managers